This article lists the Barbershop Harmony Society's international quartet champions by the year in which they won. Quartets can only win once, though up to two members may appear together in another quartet and compete again.  In this manner individual singers may win multiple gold medals.  Twenty men have won two or more gold medals. Five men have won three or more. Two men, Joe Connelly and Tony DeRosa, have won four.

Connelly sang with champion quartets Interstate Rivals (1987), Keepsake (1992), PLATINUM (2000), and Old School (2011); and DeRosa with Keepsake (1992), PLATINUM (2000), Max Q (2007), and Main Street (2017). Connelly was the first to achieve both the 3- and 4-time International Quartet Champion milestone, and DeRosa followed by doing so in multiple voice parts. Gary Lewis has won three times on three different parts with PLATINUM (2000, tenor), Max Q (2007, baritone), and Quorum (2022, bass).

Though the competition is international, only two quartets from outside North America have so far won the gold medal: Ringmasters from Sweden in 2012 and Musical Island Boys from New Zealand in 2014. The Town and Country Four were the first quartet to win internationally as the contest was held in Canada for the first time in 1963. Disruption caused by the COVID-19 pandemic resulted in cancellation of the 2020 and 2021 international contests, the only years in the society's -year history without one.

See also
List of Barbershop Harmony Society chorus champions
Sweet Adelines International competition

External links
Official list from the Barbershop Harmony Society
Official list of Sweet Adelines International quartet champions

Barbershop music
Barbershop Harmony Society
Barbershop Harmony society quartet champions
Barbershop Harmony Society quartet champions